Javkhlant may refer to:

 Javkhlant, Selenge, a sum of Selenge Province, Mongolia
 Sümber, Töv (also known as Javkhlant), a sum of Töv Province, Mongolia
 Uliastai (sometimes known as Javkhlant, a city in Zavkhan Province, Mongolia
 Javkhlant Formation, where the Haya dinosaur was discovered